In acoustics, dynamic aperture is analogous to aperture in photography. The arrays in side-scan sonar can be programmed to transmit just a few elements at a time or all the elements at once. The more elements transmitting, the narrower the beam and the better the resolution.

The ratio of the imaging depth to the aperture size is known as the F-number.  Dynamic aperture is keeping this number constant by growing the aperture with the imaging depth until the physical aperture cannot be increased. A modern medical ultrasound machine has a typical F-number of 0.5.

Side Scan Sonar systems produce images by forming angular “beams”. Beam width is determined by length of the sonar array, narrower beams resolve finer detail. Longer arrays with narrower beams provide finer spatial resolution. 

Acoustics